Dambajavyn Tsend–Ayuush (born 15 May 1952) is a Mongolian judoka. He competed at the 1976 Summer Olympics and the 1980 Summer Olympics.

References

1952 births
Living people
Mongolian male judoka
Olympic judoka of Mongolia
Judoka at the 1976 Summer Olympics
Judoka at the 1980 Summer Olympics
People from Khövsgöl Province